The Mongolian hamster (Allocricetulus curtatus) is a species of rodent in the family Cricetidae. It is one of two members of the genus Allocricetulus, and is found in China and Mongolia.

The Mongolian hamster is a wild hamster and cannot be tamed. Currently the Mongolian hamster isn't endangered but if natural water resources are removed they could become endangered.

References

Allocricetulus
Mammals described in 1925
Taxonomy articles created by Polbot
Taxa named by Glover Morrill Allen